Goddess of Victory: Nikke is a third-person shooter game developed by Shift Up and published by Level Infinite. Development of Nikke began as early as 2017, and it was released for Android and iOS in 2022, and Windows in 2023. The game's action-based battle system revolves around quick character-switching and the usage of combat skills in an anime-style environment. The role-playing video game is free-to-play and features a gacha game system, through which in-app purchases are used as a method for monetization. It garnered over US$70 million in its first month of release.

Goddess of Victory: Nikke sets in a post-apocalyptic future where the surface of the Earth was overthrown by mechanical aliens. The surviving humans fled underground and produced artificial soldiers called Nikkes. The story follows a Commander and his squad of Nikkes who hope to reclaim the surface.

Gameplay

Goddess of Victory: Nikke is a role-playing video game in which the player controls one of up to five interchangeable characters (Nikkes) who are distributed in a row facing a battlefield and positioned behind a defensive object. A third-person shooter, the player aims a reticle to shoot at enemies and takes cover to reload—which automatically happens when a character is out of ammunition—allowing them to strategically plan their attacks. Each Nikke wields her own firearm and possess one of five possible elements that determine strengths and weaknesses when attacking foes. Characters each have three unique combat skills: two normal skills and one Burst skill, the latter is each assigned with a numeric value of up to three and requires users to accumulate enough cost, amassable through damaging enemies, before activating the initial Burst—subsequent skills can be activated immediately—and a temporary Full Burst mode is entered upon triggering the final skill, which significantly increases the attack power of all allies.

A stage ends once the player defeats a powerful boss following several swarms of basic enemies. Moreover, a special battle mode called the Interception requires the player to destroy a runaway locomotive throughout the stage. The game features a cooperative multiplayer mode of up to five players who can challenge the environment.

New characters are obtainable via a gacha game system, which costs in-game currency—acquirable by playing the game or via microtransactions—to use. A pity system guarantees the player a rare character after a set number of draws. The player can raise characters' strengths by enhancing their levels and skills, increase their level caps, and equip better armor; the resources for all of those are obtainable by completing various quests.

Story

Setting
Goddess of Victory: Nikke takes place in a post-apocalyptic future where the Earth was suddenly attacked by extraterrestrial mechanical creatures called Raptures that destroyed everything on the surface, forcing the remaining humans to take refuge underground and establish the Ark, a metropolis ruled by the Central Government. The manufacturers Elysion, Missilis Industry and Tetra Line—owned by Ingrid, Syuen and Mustang, respectively—that compose the Big Three work on converting women and children into powerful obedient soldiers called Nikkes to be used as a weapon to defeat the Raptures and restore humanity on the surface. Due to their prominence, the Big Three CEOs have very high authority; they are, however, heavily monitored by the Central Government to prevent any hostile behavior.

The story is played from the perspective of the Commander who graduated from the Military Academy one day prior to the events of the game; despite this, he performs extraordinarily in his operations and survives various encounters with rare Rapture species throughout his journey. He leads a squad called Counters, which consists of the Nikkes Anis, Rapi and later down the story, Neon. The Commander views Nikkes with sympathy and privately advocates for Nikke rights, which is illegal in accordance with the laws of the Ark. Outlaws may be sent to the Rehabilitation Center or the Outer Rim, an area fully isolated from the rest of the Ark, and they have formed terrorist organizations claiming to fight for human rights for themselves.

Plot

The Commander is en route to reinforce a search and rescue party when his aircraft is shot down. He is rescued by a Nikke named Marian, who is executed following confirmation that she has been corrupted by the Raptures. Deputy Chief Andersen orders the newly formed squad, Counters, on a mission to test their combat ability, joined by Elysion's Neon. During the mission, they encounter intelligent Raptures capable of operating a power plant; they demolish the facility after noticing the squad. Andersen, impressed, banishes the group to the Outpost to operate without government surveillance, at which Syuen forces the Commander on a black operation to capture Chatterbox, a high-class Rapture capable of speech. Chatterbox overwhelms Counters, who only survive due to the arrival of Snow White, a Nikke from an independent group called the Pilgrims. Unable to continue, Counters call for an evacuation, which reveals the clandestine mission to the public, much to Syuen's frustration.

All those involved except Syuen are temporarily suspended; in addition, Rapi is sentenced to undergo a memory wipe. Andersen then orders the squad to gather intel relating to Chatterbox and Marian's corruption. However, they are soon caught in a trap set up by Chatterbox, who captures the Commander. Snow White intercepts them and defeats the Rapture, but before they can eliminate him, he is rescued by Modernia, a Heretic Nikke who has joined the Raptures. The Commander recognizes her as Marian before she escapes.

Authorities rescue the squad and promote them into Special Commandos, giving them more autonomy. Counters ascend to an ammunition factory to research a bullet dropped by Modernia, which contains an unregistered substance called vapaus. Failing to salvage any information, Exia, who is on a call with them, hacks into the Central Government's database but gets caught and sends them an encoded message before getting shot by Triangle, a police force. The squad descends down the Ark to Andersen's office, where Rapi reveals that she had been affected by vapaus, thus rendering the memory wipe ineffective, and offers to cooperate. Andersen and Ingrid authorize a new joint operation with the latter's squad to collect Heretic fragments left over from a previous skirmish.

En route, they meet up with Matis, Syuen's top squad. At their destination, Matis are ambushed by Raptures before they discover an underground stronghold system. After safely retrieving the fragments and requesting for evacuation, Rapi suppresses the members of Matis realizing they have been corrupted from the ambush. With all the found discoveries, the Central Government authorizes a major operation with the goal of capturing Modernia using firsthand interaction from Counters; they get her to regain mental clarity, but Chatterbox jumps to corrupt her again. They rescue her nonetheless and perform a neural wipe on her, the only known method to cure Nikkes' corruptions.

Due to Marian's value, many attempt to raid the Outpost and detain her, including Triangle who is sent on behalf of their Deputy Commander-in-Chief, but Andersen forcefully coerces him to rescind the mission. Unable to protect her further, Counters hand her over to the Pilgrims and fabricate that she had been kidnapped. Syuen secretly retrieves the vapaus bullet and cures Matis from their corruption.

Syuen sends Counters and Exotic, a patrol group from the Outer Rim, to ask the Pilgrims about the vapaus. Exotic, however, betrays Counters and flee the scene, but they fail to kill the Commander. The Pilgrims take care of him and tell him there is a Vapaus Institute which contains historical records. The vapaus-curing process terminates Nikkes' nanomachines that give them their obedience and courage to fight, causing public backlash against Missilis; conversely, the Commander wants Nikkes to have their own free will and proceeds back to prepare for the institute. Syuen convinces him to act out a fight between Matis and the Raptures as a last resort to sway public opinions towards Missilis.

They lure large groups of Raptures near the Ark. Matis' leader Laplace, after overcoming emotional trauma and seeing her teammates suffering, kills all the Raptures, successfully regaining public support. Andersen approves to let Counters head to the institute.

Development and release
Nikke was developed by South Korean-based studio Shift Up working with Level Infinite, a publishing brand of Tencent. Development began between 2017 and 2018 with an internal planning competition of which one idea was selected to be the predecessor of the game. It was originally planned to be played from a first-person perspective but later was changed to incorporate battle poses inspired by the Gears of War series.

Shift Up's CEO Kim Hyung-tae, who was responsible for the production and illustrations of the game, said in an interview with IGN Japan that  the battle environment features life-size models using Live2D, instead of chibi-style characters, to amplify sex appeal. Contributing composers include Hiroyuki Sawano, who produced one of the game's theme song. Shift Up and Level Infinite hosted closed beta tests for the global version between the announcement and its release, allowing selected registrants to test out the game mechanics. The game contains voice-overs in English, Japanese and Korean.

Shift Up first revealed Nikke along with Project Eve at the Crank in Showcase event in 2019, with several trade exhibitions being held ahead of its launch, such as at BEXCO and Tokyo Game Show. The game was initially planned to be released worldwide for Android and iOS in 2020, but it was rescheduled and officially released on November 4, 2022. A Microsoft Windows version of the game was released on February 15, 2023, alongside a brand collaboration with Chainsaw Man.

Reception

According to data analysis from SensorTower, Nikke grossed over $70 million in revenue in its first month of release, which was mostly generated from Japan, South Korea, and the United States. It made a total of more than $100 million as of December 2022 and saw over 25 million downloads before the Windows port's release. PocketGamer.biz reported that though the game's "excess of fanservice" played a significant role in its "more than respectable levels of success", its unique gacha mechanics may have also been a contributing factor.

Goddess of Victory: Nikke was nominated for the Famitsu Dengeki Game Awards 2022's "Best App" category.

Following the release of a character costume, players criticized Tencent for having the design altered from beta versions to show less revealing clothing. Since Tencent is based in China, its video games must adhere to the censorship policies of China in addition to those of other jurisdictions. In January 2023, an official Thai advertisement—which depicted a Nikke player watching a character's bouncing buttocks and fantasizing about such with cosplayers—was taken down and apologized for by Tencent after they received backlash from Thai fans who were unhappy with the portrayal of the playerbase. This pullback, however, faced another backlash from a different portion of fans who were already upset with the censorship, claiming that "there is nothing wrong with the ad for being honest about why some players are attracted to the game".

Notes

References

Sources

External links

2022 video games
Android (operating system) games
Cooperative video games
Free-to-play video games
Gacha games
iOS games
Multiplayer and single-player video games
Post-apocalyptic video games
Role-playing video games
Third-person shooters
Video game controversies
Video games developed in South Korea
Video games featuring non-playable protagonists
Video games containing battle passes
Shift Up games